The Blue Hour is a 2015 Thai horror film directed by Anucha Boonyawatana. It was screened in the Panorama section of the 65th Berlin International Film Festival.

Plot
This gay romance-horror tells a story of a bullied teenager Tam (Atthaphan Phunsawat) who befriends and has a sexual relationship with a mysterious gay boy Phum (Oabnithi Wiwattanawarang) at a haunted abandoned pool. Their affair starts out as a romance but, later, shifts to a darker territory.

Cast
 Oabnithi Wiwattanawarang
 Atthaphan Phunsawat
 Duangjai Hirunsri
 Panutchai Kittisatima
 Nithiroj Simkamtom

See also
List of lesbian, gay, bisexual or transgender-related films of 2015

References

External links
 

2015 films
2015 horror films
Thai-language films
Thai LGBT-related films
Gay-related films
LGBT-related horror films
2015 LGBT-related films